Ross Talbot Harris  (born 1 August 1945) is a New Zealand composer, multi-instrumentalist, and music educator.

Life and career
Born in Amberley, Harris was educated at the University of Canterbury and Victoria University of Wellington; studying with Douglas Lilburn at the latter institution. He succeeded Lilburn as the professor of electro-acoustic music at Victoria University; a position he maintained for over thirty years.

A composer with wide interests, Harris's compositions have spanned from classical music works like symphonies, operas, and chamber music, to electro-acoustic music, jazz, and rock music. He is a founding member of the Wellington-based band Free Radicals whose pioneering experiments in electro-acoustic music in the 1980s influenced the development of electronica in the 1990s. He achieved significant critical attention for his 1984 opera Waituhi: Te Ora O Te Whanau, the first opera created in the Māori language, and in the 1986 Queen's Birthday Honours, he was awarded the Queen's Service Medal for public services. 

Harris was the resident composer of the Auckland Philharmonia Orchestra in 2005 and 2006; during which time he composed three symphonies for that orchestra. In 2014 he was awarded the Laureate Award by Arts Foundation of New Zealand. He has won the SOUNZ Contemporary Award from the Australasian Performing Right Association five times.

As an instrumentalist, Harris has worked as a French hornist in the New Zealand Symphony Orchestra and as an accordion player in the Wellington klezmer group The Kugels. He has also used many electro-acoustic instruments in his work with the Free Radicals.

References

1945 births
Living people
People from Amberley, New Zealand
University of Canterbury alumni
New Zealand composers
Accordionists
Classical horn players
Recipients of the Queen's Service Medal
Victoria University of Wellington alumni
Academic staff of the Victoria University of Wellington